Acorns is an American financial technology and financial services company based in Irvine, California that specializes in micro-investing and robo advice. According to Fortune's Impact 20 list for the year 2020, Acorns had 8.2 million customers and $3 billion in assets under management.

History
The company was launched in 2012 by father and son duo Walter Wemple Cruttenden III and Jeffrey James Cruttenden to promote incremental and passive investing. It launched in 2014 with an app for iOS and Android devices. The portfolio options a user can select from were designed in partnership with paid advisor Harry Markowitz, a Nobel laureate.

Since its inception, the platform has expanded to include checking account services and retirement IRA products. This was made possible following an acquisition of Portland, Oregon fintech retirement startup, Vault.

In 2018, behavioral economist Shlomo Benartzi was appointed chair of a behavioral economics committee at Acorns, working on an initiative termed the Money Lab to conduct field experiments focused on consumer spending.

Since its founding, the company has raised approximately $100 million in venture capital funding. As of August 2019, notable investors in Acorns included Jennifer Lopez, Alex Rodriguez, Bono, Ashton Kutcher and Kevin Durant. PayPal, BlackRock, and NBCUniversal also have a stake in the company.

In May 2021, Acorns planned go to public through a merger with a blank-check company Pioneer Merger Corp. These plans were canceled in January 2022, citing market conditions.

Services
Upon registering with Acorns, a user selects from among several portfolios of varied asset allocation. A credit or debit card is linked to the account, whereafter each purchase made with the card is rounded up to the next whole dollar, and the difference is added to the Acorns investment portfolio; one also manually may make contributions to one's account. On launch, Acorns charged a $1.00 fee for its service, which offer was ended on September 21st of 2021. As of February 21st, 2022, Acorns offers personal accounts for the flat rate of $3.00 per month ($36.00 per year); this, for instance, equates to a 0.36% (thirty-six basis-point) fee on a $10,000.00 account, or, a 3.60% (360 basis-point) fee on a $1,000.00 account. 

Acorns's flat-fee structure can be highly significant for clients who rely solely upon the firm's round-ups for investing into their accounts: for example, if making one purchase on every day of a calendar year, the highest sum an account-holder theoretically could contribute (at ninety-nine cents of change on each of three hundred and sixty-five purchases) is $361.35; minus her annual fee, she would forfeit 9.96% of her money, with only the remaining 90.04% available to her investment portfolio; this difference becomes further exaggerated whenever a transaction yields less than ninety-cents in change, or when fewer than one purchase is made per day. As is the case with most robo-advisor investment platforms, Acorns portfolios are composed of third-party passively-managed exchange-traded funds (E.T.F.s), which additionally charge their own underlying expenses. As of February 21, 2022, the company's portfolios comprise combinations of seventeen predominantly stock or bond E.T.F.s, owned by either Vanguard or BlackRock.

Regulatory action

In 2017, Acorns was censured and fined by the Financial Industry Regulatory Authority for failing to maintain proper customer records.

See also
 Stash

References

Financial services companies based in California
Financial services companies established in 2012
Companies based in Irvine, California
Financial technology companies
American companies established in 2012
2012 establishments in California
Privately held companies based in California
Robo-advisors